Azamora crameriana is a species of snout moth in the genus Azamora. It was described by Stoll in 1781, and is known from Suriname.

References

Chrysauginae
Moths described in 1781
Moths of South America